Gulag Orkestar is the debut album of Beirut. It was recorded in 2005 in Albuquerque, New Mexico. The Gulag was a Soviet government agency administering criminal justice, while orkestar is the Croatian word for "orchestra". 

It is written in the booklet that the front and back photos were found in a library in Leipzig, torn out of a book. The original photographer was unknown to the creators of the album while it was recorded, but has since been discovered to be Sergey Chilikov.

Reception 

The album has received great critical acclaim and was later re-released to include the Lon Gisland EP.

As of 2009, sales in the United States have exceeded 79,000 copies, according to Nielsen SoundScan.

Track listing
Many song titles are named after toponyms in Europe, such as cities, states and neighboorhoods. Prenzlauerberg is a locality in Berlin. Brandenburg and Rhineland are geographical areas in Germany. Bratislava is the capital of Slovakia.

The EP's version of "Scenic World" differs from the first in that it has a slower, stronger sound and is entirely acoustic, with a violin and accordion replacing the original MIDI keyboard.

In popular culture
The song "Elephant Gun" was the main theme of the 2008 TV minisseries Capitu, by the brazilian network TV Globo, an adaptation of the 1899 novel Dom Casmurro, written by Machado de Assis.

Personnel
Beirut
 Zach Condon - vocals, trumpet, flugelhorn, ukulele, percussion, mandolin, accordion, organ, piano, recording
 Heather Trost - violin
 Jeremy Barnes - percussion, accordion
 Perrin Cloutier - cello
 Hari Ziznewski - clarinet

Additional personnel
 Alan Douches - mastering
 Josh Clark - recording, mixing
 Ben Goldberg - photography (all cover)

References

2006 debut albums
Beirut (band) albums
Ba Da Bing Records albums